Ben Khlil is a small town and rural commune in Tan-Tan Province, Guelmim-Oued Noun, Morocco. At the time of the 2004 census, the commune had a total population of 316 people living in 66 households.

References

Populated places in Tan-Tan Province
Rural communes of Guelmim-Oued Noun